Sri Maravijayottunggavarman was a king of Srivijaya Kingdom of Shailendra dynasty, who reigned between 1008-c.1025 CE. He was the son of King Sri Chudamanivarmadeva. He was called Se-li-ma-la-pi in the Chinese chronicle.

Biography 
Maravijayottunggavarman started his reign around 1008 CE, when he was recorded to have sent three envoys to the emperor of China. Srivijaya was also in a good relationship with the Chola Empire, which at that time was under King Rajaraja I. The Leiden Inscription (1044 CE) mentions that Maravijayottunggavarman even built a Buddhist vihara known as Chudamani Vihara at Nagapattinam, dedicated to his late father's name.

Chinese sources also speak of a major warfare between his kingdom and the Kingdom of Mataram of East Java. In 1016 CE, Srivijaya may be assisting a rebellious vassal state of Mataram, causing the death of King Dharmavangsa Teguh Anantavikrama and the destruction of Mataram Kingdom.

See also
 Srivijaya
 Chudamani Vihara

References

Srivijaya
Shailendra dynasty
Indonesian Buddhist monarchs
11th-century monarchs in Asia
11th-century Indonesian people